The first season of Futurama began airing on March 28, 1999 and concluded on November 14, 1999 after 13 episodes.

The original 72-episode run of Futurama was produced as four seasons; Fox broadcast the episodes out of the intended order, resulting in five aired seasons. 
As a consequence, the show's canon is disrupted by the broadcast order, and more, different regions and networks use different ordering for the episodes.

The list below features the episodes in original production order, as featured on the DVD box sets.

The entire season is included within the Volume One DVD box set, which was released on March 25, 2003. The last four episodes were pre-empted by sporting events and pushed into the second broadcast season.

The full thirteen episodes of the season have been released on a box set called Futurama: Volume One, on DVD and VHS. It was released in the United Kingdom, on January 28, 2002, in Australia on November 27, 2002 and in the United States and Canada on March 25, 2003. The season was re-released as Futurama: Volume 1, with entirely different packaging to match the newer season releases on July 17, 2012.

Production

Matt Groening initially conceived of Futurama in the mid-1990s. In 1996, he enlisted David X. Cohen, then a Simpsons writer and producer, to assist in developing the series; the two then spent time researching science fiction books, television shows, and films of the past. By the time they pitched the series to Fox in April 1998, Groening and Cohen had composed many characters and story lines. During that first meeting, Fox ordered thirteen episodes. Shortly after, however, Groening and Fox executives argued over whether the network would have any creative input into the show. With The Simpsons the network has no input. Groening explains, "When they tried to give me notes on Futurama, I just said: 'No, we're going to do this just the way we did Simpsons.' And they said, 'Well, we don't do business that way anymore.' And I said, 'Oh, well, that's the only way I do business.'" After negotiations, he received the same independence with Futurama. The name "Futurama" comes from a pavilion at the 1939 New York World's Fair. Designed by Norman Bel Geddes, the Futurama pavilion depicted how he imagined the world would look in 1959.

Reception
The first season of Futurama received positive reviews from critics. Patrick Lee of Science Fiction Weekly commented, based on a viewing of "Space Pilot 3000" alone, that Futurama was not as funny as The Simpsons, particularly as "the satire is leavened with treacly sentimental bits about free will and loneliness". The episode was rated as an "A- pick" and found to "warrant further viewing" despite these concerns. Rob Owen of the Pittsburgh Post-Gazette noted that although the series' premiere contained the same skewed humor as The Simpsons, it was not as smart and funny, and he attributed this to the large amount of exposition and character introduction required of a television series pilot, noting that the show was "off to a good start." Andrew Billen of New Statesman found the premise of "Space Pilot 3000" to be unoriginal, but remained somewhat enthusiastic about the future of the series. While he praised the humorous details of the episode, such as the background scenes while Fry was frozen, he also criticized the show's dependence on in-jokes such as Groening's head being present in the head museum. The episode was ranked in 2006 by IGN as number 14 in their list of the top 25 Futurama episodes. In the 2013/2019 reranking, the episode dropped to number 17. Tal Blevins of IGN had positive review on the season and said "You really can't go wrong wherever you look in Futurama Volume One, and there are no stinkers in this collection." The season tied for 89th in the seasonal ratings tied with Profiler with an average viewership of 8.9 million viewers.

The series' premiere "Space Pilot 3000" garnered "unprecedented strong numbers" with a Nielsen rating of 11.2/17 in homes and 9.6/23 in adults 18–49. The Futurama premiere was watched by more people than either its lead-in show (The Simpsons) or the show following it (The X-Files), and it was the number one show among men aged 18–49 and teenagers for the week.

Episodes

Home releases

References

Futurama lists
1999 American television seasons
 
Futurama seasons